Acacia siculiformis, commonly known as dagger wattle, is a shrub belonging to the genus Acacia and the subgenus Phyllodineae native to south eastern Australia.

Description
It has smooth to tessellated grey coloured bark and glabrous, terete and resinous branchlets. The rigid, green phyllodes have a very narrowly elliptic to linear-lanceolate shape and are straight to slightly curved. The shrub blooms between August and November and produces simple inflorescences that occur singly or in pairs in the axils. The smooth and glabrous pods have a few fine lateral veins near the margins.

Distribution
It is endemic to a large area with the bulk of the population found from around Nowra in New South Wales south through the Australian Capital Territory to around Mount Buller. Scattered populations are found further north in New South Wales and also in Tasmania. It is often situated near and around creeks and streams growing in rocky or sandy soils as a part of open Eucalyptus forest communities.

See also
 List of Acacia species

References

siculiformis
Flora of New South Wales
Flora of Victoria (Australia)
Plants described in 1842
Taxa named by Allan Cunningham (botanist)